KUHL (1440 AM) is a commercial radio station that is licensed to Santa Maria, California and serves the Santa Maria—Lompoc, California area. The station is owned by Knight Broadcasting Inc. and broadcasts a news/talk format.

History
The station first signed on January 17, 1947 as KCOY at the 1400 kHz frequency. It was launched by News-Press Publishing Company, owner of KTMS in Santa Barbara and the Santa Barbara News-Press. On April 5, 1955, KCOY was sold to Arenze Broadcasters, headed by James H. Ranger, for $34,000. It moved to 1440 kHz in 1960. In its early years, KCOY was a full service station, broadcasting a variety of news, sports, and rock music programming.

In April 1969, Ranger bought out his Arenze Broadcasters partners for $250,000, taking full ownership of KCOY. The station then changed its call letters to KUHL.

In 1986, Ranger sold KUHL and FM sister station KXFM in Santa Maria to Great Electric Communications Inc. for $2.25 million. On March 1, 1989, the transmitters for four stations in Santa Maria, including KUHL, were knocked off the air due to acts of vandalism. That evening, the towers fell as guy wires supporting the structures had been cut. Two males, ages 18 and 15, were suspected of inflicting the damage which was estimated to be $100,000. Great Electric sold KUHL and KXFM in 1991 to Roger Blaemire's Blackhawk Communications Inc. for $1.15 million.

On September 19, 2006, KUHL switched call signs to KINF. Three years later, on January 27, 2009, the station reverted to the KUHL call letters. On January 20, 2010, lightning struck the KUHL transmitter, knocking the station off the air temporarily. It was one of 11 stations in the Santa Maria area affected by storm-related power outages and equipment damage.

References

External links
FCC History Cards for KUHL

UHL
News and talk radio stations in the United States
Radio stations established in 1947
Santa Maria, California
1946 establishments in California